John Dennis Downie (19 July 1925 – 19 February 2013) was a Scottish footballer. He was born in Lanark, and played as an inside forward. Downie played football as a member of the Lanark Air Training Corps, but joined Bradford Park Avenue as an amateur in August 1942. After spending time working in a colliery in Bradford, he turned professional in December 1944, and made his debut when football restarted after the Second World War.

After 33 goals in 86 league appearances for Bradford Park Avenue, he joined Manchester United in March 1949 for a club record £18,000 as a replacement for the departing Johnny Morris. Downie scored 37 goals (including five in the FA Cup) in 116 appearances for the club, before leaving for Luton Town for £10,000 in 1953.

Downie also played league football for Hull City, Mansfield Town and Darlington, and spent time in the non-league with King's Lynn, Wisbech Town, Hyde United, Mossley and Stalybridge Celtic. After retiring from football, Downie worked as a newsagent in Bradford. He later lived in Tynemouth and regularly watched local teams North Shields and Whitley Bay, and also played snooker. He died in Tynemouth on 19 February 2013.

References

External links
 
 John Downie at StretfordEnd.co.uk
 Johnny Downie obituary at Manutd.com

1925 births
2013 deaths
Sportspeople from Lanark
Association football inside forwards
Scottish footballers
Bradford (Park Avenue) A.F.C. players
Manchester United F.C. players
Luton Town F.C. players
Hull City A.F.C. players
King's Lynn F.C. players
Wisbech Town F.C. players
Mansfield Town F.C. players
Darlington F.C. players
Hyde United F.C. players
Mossley A.F.C. players
Stalybridge Celtic F.C. players
English Football League players
Footballers from South Lanarkshire